Loek Bos   (born The Hague, 4 November 1946) is a Dutch cartoonist, painter and sculptor.  He is a member of the Pulchri Studio in The Hague.  Among his works is a memorial to the composer Cornelis Dopper, erected in Stadskanaal in 2010.

References
Floor Kist: Haags Palet, deel 14: Mise-en-scène Loek Bos, 2006

1946 births
Living people
Dutch cartoonists
Dutch painters
Dutch male painters
Dutch sculptors
Dutch male sculptors
Artists from The Hague